The Harpiinae is a bird of prey subfamily which consists of large broad-winged species. There are 4 genera in the subfamily, all are monotypic.

Species

References

Lerner, Heather R. L.; Mindell, David P. (November 2005). "Phylogeny of eagles, Old World vultures, and other Accipitridae based on nuclear and mitochondrial DNA" (PDF). Molecular Phylogenetics and Evolution. 37 (2): 327–346. doi:10.1016/j.ympev.2005.04.010. ISSN 1055-7903. . Retrieved 31 May 2011.

 
Bird subfamilies
Eagles